Tom William Thomas CBE (14 May 1914 – 17 August 1999) was the Anglican Dean of Melbourne from 1962 to 1984.

Thomas was born in Brisbane but raised in Victoria. He attended Kyneton High School and then studied theology at Ridley College. He was ordained in 1941. After a curacy in Geelong he was a chaplain in the AIF from 1942 to 1946. He was then the incumbent at Doncaster before becoming Archdeacon of Brighton in 1959. Thomas was appointed Dean of Melbourne in 1962, and in that capacity led the memorial service for Harold Holt, which was held at St Paul's Cathedral on 22 December 1967. In retirement he ministered at Mount Martha.

References

Australian Anglican priests
University of Melbourne alumni
Alumni of Ridley College, Melbourne
Anglican archdeacons in Australia
Deans of Melbourne
1914 births
1999 deaths
People from Brisbane